Pestravsky District is an administrative and municipal district (raion), one of the twenty-seven in Samara Oblast, Russia. It is located in the southwest of the oblast. Its administrative center is the rural locality (a selo) of Pestravka. Population: 17,779 (2010 Census);  The population of Pestravka accounts for 37.0% of the district's total population.

References

Notes

Sources

Districts of Samara Oblast